Selsey Lifeboat Station is a Royal National Lifeboat Institution (RNLI) station located in  Selsey, West Sussex on the south coast of England.

The station operates a  lifeboat Denise and Eric (ON-1327) which is launched via SLARS from the main boathouse that stands onshore at the Kingsway, Selsey. The station also operates a  inshore lifeboat, RNLB Betty and Thomas Moore (D-691).

In 2017, Selsey received a new 25 knot (29 mph) Shannon Class Lifeboat after almost 34 years of service by  lifeboats RNLB City of London (ON-1074) and RNLB Voluntary Worker (ON-1146) the longest of any RNLI station.

History

1861–World War II 
The lifeboat service in Selsey was established in 1861 with RNLB The Friend, which was launched from the beach by means of skids. For the station's first 25 years the lifeboat's Coxswain was James Lawrence. 

In 1925 work began on the construction of a new boathouse built on a piled platform with a gangway from the shore, which had a trolley track. In 1927 the boathouse was re-built again to house the station's new motor lifeboat.

During the Second World War, the station's crew and lifeboats were involved in many rescues. Watson-class lifeboat RNLB Canadian Pacific (ON 803) launched approximately 50 times, often to rescue pilots from fallen aeroplanes. On 11 July 1940, the lifeboat rescued John Peel, the commanding officer of RAF 145 Squadron, minutes after he abandoned his damaged Hurricane (P3400) off Selsey Bill.

1952–1987: improvements and inshore service 

Between 1952 and 1953, the boathouse's substructure was strengthened and the slipway was lengthened. The boathouse was rebuilt in 1958 with reinforced concrete as the old structure had become unsafe due to years of coastal erosion. The deep water roller slipway was re-configured to have a gradient of 1:5, and the station was given a new fabricated steel approach gangway from the shore.

In March 1968, an inshore lifeboat rescue division was established at Selsey. The new inshore lifeboat was launched on a newly constructed gangway to the eastern side of the main slipway. The first inshore lifeboat was a D-class lifeboat. 

RNLB Canadian Pacific was withdrawn from Selsey in 1969 to serve in the RNLI relief fleet. Then in 1977 she was  sold out of the service.

A new boathouse was constructed for the inshore lifeboat in 1987.

2011–present: 150th anniversary and onwards 
In 2011, the RNLI celebrated Selsey's 150th anniversary as a continuously active lifeboat station.

In the summer of 2017, a new Selsey boathouse was built on shore at the Kingsway, which allowed all elements of the RNLI at Selsey to come together on a single site for the first time. The old Slipway station was demolished and removed between June and July 2017. In July 2017, the station's Tyne-class lifeboat Voluntary Worker was replaced by a new Shannon-class lifeboat, Denise and Eric, and Voluntary Worker was returned to Poole Headquarters.

Fleet

All weather lifeboats

Inshore lifeboats

Station honours 

The following are among the RNLI medals and other awards presented to crew members from Selsey Lifeboat Station:

Neighbouring station locations

References 

Lifeboat stations in West Sussex
Selsey